Virmaše is a settlement in the Municipality of Škofja Loka in the Upper Carniola region of Slovenia.

Name
The settlement was attested in written sources in 1286 as Erenbrehen (and as Erinrich in 1291, Ernnechen and Ermbrechen before 1392, Ernwrehen in 1395, Emerhern in 1421, and Ermerhern in 1428). The Slovene name is a fused prepositional phrase, from *v Ermaše. The initial *Ver- changed to Vir- as a regular sound change in the local dialect. The root of the Slovene name is the accusative plural demonym *Erm(r)ašane, derived from the toponym *Ermrah. This was borrowed into Slovene from Middle High German *Eren-rîch, a compound originally meaning 'rich in honor'.

Notable people
Notable people that were born or lived in Virmaše include:
Gašper Porenta (1870–1930), painter
France Mihelič (1907–1998), painter
Stane Mihelič (1906–2005), Slavic specialist, education specialist, and beekeeper
Viktor Volčjak (1913–1987), physician

References

External links

Virmaše at Geopedia

Populated places in the Municipality of Škofja Loka